The Central Collegiate Hockey Association (CCHA) is a college athletic conference that participates in the NCAA's Division I as a hockey-only conference. The current CCHA began play in the 2021–22 season; a previous incarnation, which the current CCHA recognizes as part of its history, existed from 1971 to 2013. Half of its members are located in the state of Michigan, with additional members in Minnesota and Ohio. It has also had teams located in Alaska, Illinois, Indiana, Missouri and Nebraska  over the course of its existence.

The CCHA was disbanded after the 2012–13 season as the result of a conference realignment stemming from the Big Ten Conference (of which three CCHA schools; Michigan, Michigan State, and Ohio State, were primary members) choosing to sponsor Division I ice hockey beginning in the 2013–14 season. The remaining CCHA members received invitations to other conferences, such as the newly formed National Collegiate Hockey Conference (NCHC), Hockey East, and the Western Collegiate Hockey Association (WCHA), which itself had been depleted by the Big Ten and NCHC. The conference's last game before its hiatus was the final of the 2013 CCHA Men's Ice Hockey Tournament at Joe Louis Arena in Detroit, where Notre Dame beat Michigan 3–1 to win the Mason Cup championship.

On February 18, 2020, seven schools who had applied to leave the WCHA announced they would form a new CCHA for the 2021–22 season, citing a more compact geographic footprint and a desire to improve regional alignment, among other reasons. St. Thomas, a former D-III school, joined them later that year as the CCHA's newest member as well as the conference's eighth team.

History

Foundation
The CCHA began in 1971 as an NCAA conference composed of Bowling Green, Ohio, Ohio State and Saint Louis. After adding Lake Superior State for year two, both Ohio State and Ohio withdrew from the conference, leaving the CCHA with a scant 3 members. Despite the trouble, the three teams rode out the rough patch and the league began to grow with the addition of Western Michigan and the return of Ohio State.

NCAA acceptance
Up until 1976 the NCAA had only offered bids to the tournament from teams in either ECAC Hockey or the WCHA. Because those were the only two Division I conferences for most years there was no controversy but, after the CCHA had proved to be more than just a flash in the pan, the tournament had to change. Beginning with the 1977 Championship the NCAA allowed itself the freedom  to add up to four additional teams to the tournament with the understanding that the CCHA tournament champion would receive one of the additional bids. Bowling Green won the first tournament game for the conference but it wasn't until Northern Michigan reached the championship game in 1980 that the league began to gain acceptance.

WCHA defectors
1981 saw a major shift in college ice hockey with four teams from the WCHA defecting to the CCHA. The move was done as a way to reduce travel costs as well as provide the new team with a better chance at making the NCAA Tournament (many of the CCHA teams were still seen as lesser programs). Michigan State made the tournament in its first three season of CCHA play but it was founding member Bowling Green that won the conference's first national championship in 1984.

National prominence
Bill Beagan served as commissioner of the CCHA from 1985 to 1998. He implemented a pre-season training camp for referees, despite the officials going on strike in protest. He developed a working relationship with the NHL to develop future officials in collegiate hockey.

He sought to have CCHA games televised as a game-of-the-week, and signed the first national television contract for colleges in the United States. He brought in cable television partners which included the Pro Am Sports System and Fox Sports Net. He introduced instant replay to the CCHA in 1993, to be used at its league championships, and arranged for the CCHA Men's Ice Hockey Tournament finals to be played at Joe Louis Arena. He was credited with coining the phrase, "Road to the Joe", in reference to end-of-year tournament culminating at the Joe Louis Arena.

Prior to Beagan's arrival, the CCHA had not been a profitable association. After 10 years as commissioner, the league had made $4 million. Profits were shared with the schools, which were reinvested into hockey programs and new arenas. On-ice results improved during his tenure, and CCHA teams won six NCAA Division I Men's Ice Hockey Tournament championships. In addition, Beagan convinced the University of Notre Dame to resurrect its hockey program in 1992.

Building on Bowling Green State's national title in 1984, the CCHA established itself further as the Michigan State Spartans won their second national championship and first as a member of the CCHA in 1986, and the Lake Superior State Lakers won the 1988 national championship, their first NCAA championship.  The Lake Superior State Lakers would continue their NCAA success by winning both the 1992 and 1994 NCAA ice hockey championships and finishing as the national runner-up in 1993. In addition to the success of the Lakers and Spartans, the Michigan Wolverines began a streak of 22 consecutive tournament appearances in 1991 and won national titles in 1996 and 1998. While the conference and most of its teams were stable throughout the early 21st century, the CCHA suffered a mortal blow at the end of the decade.

Realignment and discontinuation

Pennsylvania State University announced on September 17, 2010 the transition of its men's and women's American Collegiate Hockey Association (ACHA) programs to NCAA Division I status in 2012. Just over a month earlier, then-commissioner Tom Anastos publicly stated that the CCHA would strongly consider adding Penn State as the conference's 12th member. Instead, the league was left to deal with the imminent departures of Michigan, Michigan State and Ohio State when the Big Ten Conference disclosed on March 21, 2011 its intention to establish a men's ice hockey circuit to begin play in the 2013–14 season, as the conference now had enough hockey teams to earn an automatic bid in the NCAA tournament for its champion. Joining the existing CCHA members were the University of Minnesota and the University of Wisconsin from the WCHA, as well as Penn State.

The next school slated to leave the CCHA in 2013 was Miami University which became a charter member of the NCHC on July 15, 2011. Western Michigan accepted an invitation to join the new league just over two months later on September 22.

The demise of the CCHA was further accelerated when five members decided to move to the WCHA following the 2012–13 campaign. Northern Michigan University, returning to the WCHA after leaving in 1997, was the first to make the announcement on July 20, followed by Alaska, Ferris State and Lake Superior State on August 26 and Bowling Green on October 4.

Notre Dame accepted an invitation to the Hockey East Association in a press conference on October 5, 2011.

Revival
On June 28, 2019, seven schools from the ten-member WCHA began the process of withdrawing from the conference, with the intent of forming a new conference for the 2021–22 season. These seven schools were Bemidji State, Bowling Green (who had retained the rights to the CCHA name), Ferris State, Lake Superior State, Michigan Tech, Minnesota State and Northern Michigan. The seven schools cited a more compact geographic footprint as one reason for the move; the remaining three WCHA members, Alabama-Huntsville, Alaska and Alaska–Anchorage, all geographic outliers in the WCHA, were notably absent. On February 18, 2020 these seven schools announced they would begin competing in a new CCHA in 2021–22. Later that year, the University of St. Thomas, a former D-III school who had been granted a waiver by the NCAA earlier in the year to transition directly to D-I, was announced to be joining the new CCHA as a member on July 29, 2020, bringing the membership up to an even eight teams.

Don Lucia, a former head coach at Alaska, Colorado College, and Minnesota, was named as commissioner of the new CCHA on June 17, 2020. A new league logo was introduced shortly thereafter.

On May 17, 2022, Augustana University was announced as the league's ninth member. The Vikings will play a partial league schedule in the 2023–24 and 2024-25 seasons before playing a full league schedule in 2025-26.

Current members

Future member

Former members

Membership timeline

Regular-season champions

1972 Ohio State/Saint Louis
1973 Saint Louis
1974 Lake Superior State/Saint Louis
1975 Saint Louis
1976 Bowling Green
1977 Saint Louis
1978 Bowling Green
1979 Bowling Green
1980 Northern Michigan
1981 Northern Michigan
1982 Bowling Green
1983 Bowling Green
1984 Bowling Green
1985 Michigan State
1986 Michigan State
1987 Bowling Green
1988 Lake Superior State
1989 Michigan State
1990 Michigan State
1991 Lake Superior State
1992 Lake Superior State

1993 Miami
1994 Michigan
1995 Michigan
1996 Lake Superior State/Michigan
1997 Michigan
1998 Michigan State
1999 Michigan State
2000 Michigan
2001 Michigan State
2002 Michigan
2003 Ferris State
2004 Michigan
2005 Michigan
2006 Miami
2007 Notre Dame
2008 Michigan
2009 Notre Dame
2010 Miami
2011 Michigan
2012 Ferris State
2013 Miami
2022 Minnesota State
2023 Minnesota State

Conference Records
Team's records against current conference opponents. (As of the end of the 2020-21 season.)

Conference arenas

Awards
At the conclusion of each regular season schedule the coaches of each CCHA team vote which players they choose to be on the three All-Conference Teams: first team, second team and rookie team. Additionally they vote to award up to 9 of the 12 individual trophies to an eligible player at the same time (depending upon the year). The CCHA also awards a Perani Cup, a Humanitarian Award, which are awarded rather than voted upon, and a Most Valuable Player in Tournament which is voted on at the conclusion of the conference tournament. None of the individual awards conferred by the CCHA have been given for the entire existence of the conference. Only the Tournament MVP was awarded in the inaugural CCHA season, but that award was discontinued thereafter until 1982. Several of the aforementioned awards were revived along with the league in 2021–22. The awards presented by the original CCHA for best offensive and defensive defenseman were merged into a single award for best defenseman, and the original CCHA's award for best defensive forward was folded into the award for best forward.

All-Conference Teams

Individual awards

Current

Former

All-Decade Teams

1970s All-Decade Team
1970s All-Decade Team

First Team
F Steve Bozek, 1978–81, Northern Michigan
F Bill Joyce, 1976–80, Northern Michigan
F John Markell, 1975–79, Bowling Green
D Tom Laidlaw, 1976–80, Northern Michigan
D Ken Morrow, 1975–79, Bowling Green
G Mike Liut, 1973–77, Bowling Green

Second Team
F Bob Dobek, 1972–75, Bowling Green
F Rick Kennedy, 1971–75, Saint Louis
F Mark Wells, 1975–79, Bowling Green
D Roger Archer, 1971–75, Bowling Green
D Tom Davies, 1970–74, D, Lake Superior State
D Don Waddell, 1976–80, Northern Michigan
G Steve Weeks, 1976–1980, Northern Michigan

1980s All-Decade Team
1980s All-Decade Team

First Team
F Nelson Emerson, 1986–90, Bowling Green
F George McPhee, 1978–82, Bowling Green
F Kip Miller, 1986–90, Michigan State
D Rob Blake, 1987–90, Bowling Green
D Wayne Gagné, 1983–87, Western Michigan
G Ron Scott, 1980–83, Michigan State

Second Team
F Dan Dorion, 1982–86, Western Michigan
F Brian Hills, 1979–83, Bowling Green
F Paul Pooley, 1981–84, Ohio State
D Garry Galley, 1981–84, Bowling Green
D Don McSween, 1983–87, Michigan State
G Gary Kruzich, 1983–87, Bowling Green

1990s All-Decade Team
1990s All-Decade Team

First Team
F Jim Dowd, 1987–91, Lake Superior State
F Brendan Morrison, 1993–97, Michigan
F Mike York, 1995–99, Michigan State
D Keith Aldridge, 1992–96, Lake Superior State
D Mark Astley, 1988–92, Lake Superior State
G Marty Turco, 1994–98, Michigan

Second Team
F Denny Felsner, 1988–92, Michigan
F Brian Holzinger, 1991–95, Bowling Green
F Dwayne Norris, 1988–92, Michigan State
D Dan Boyle, 1994–98, Miami
D Mike Weaver, 1996–00, Michigan State
G Darrin Madeley, 1989–92, Lake Superior State

2000-2013 All-Decade Team
2000-2013 All-Decade Team

First Team
F T. J. Hensick, 2003–07, Michigan
F Chris Kunitz, 1999–03, Ferris State
F Kevin Porter, 2004–08, Michigan
D Andy Greene, 2002–06, Miami
D John-Michael Liles, 1999–03, Michigan State
G Ryan Miller, 1999–02, Michigan State

Second Team
F Ryan Jones, 2004–08, Miami
F Andy Miele, 2007–11, Miami
F Scott Parse, 2003–07, Omaha
D Brad Fast, 1999–03, Michigan State
D Greg Zanon, 1999–03, Omaha
G Cody Reichard, 2008–12, Miami

References

External links
 Official CCHA site

 
Farmington Hills, Michigan
College ice hockey conferences in the United States